Sahim Alwan is a Yemeni-American who grew up in the suburbs of Buffalo, New York. In 2002, he was arrested and charged as part of the War on Terror together with the other members of the "Lackawanna Six", based on the fact the group of friends had attended an Afghan training camp together years earlier.

Like the others, although initially entering a plea of "not guilty", he eventually pleaded guilty to "providing material support or resources to a foreign terrorist organization". He was convicted and received a 9.5-year sentence.

Life
Described as the "clean-cut" son of a steelworker, Alwan was noted for always wearing a shirt and tie, every day of his adult life, and studied criminal justice at the local community college. During the Gulf War, he and a group of friends were assaulted for their ethnicity outside a Lackawanna restaurant.

In the late 1990s, while working for Blue Cross and Blue Shield Association, he cooperated with the FBI to help investigate a fraud case, and asked them about the possibility of working for them as a career.

A "local success story", he maintained a stable marriage, had three children, and worked with the Iroquois Job Corps Center to help employ indigent and troubled youth.

At al-Farooq training camp he was discouraged by the fact they were training for offensive wars and wars against fellow Muslims, rather than in defence of Muslim populations. He announced that he wanted to leave and return home. He met personally with Osama bin Laden, who wanted to convince him to stay and finish his training. Taher, Moseb and Galeb also decided to leave. They were all driven to Quetta, and rather than wait a day for the next plane, took a bus to Karachi so they could leave Pakistan immediately.

Immediately following the September 11th attacks, Alwan was interviewed as a man on the street by the Buffalo News as he left his mosque, to give his opinion on the attacks. He responded that Islam guaranteed hellfire to anyone who took part in a suicide mission. He phoned agent Ed Needham at the FBI that night, to promise his full cooperation in the Muslim community if the FBI needed help.

References

American people imprisoned on charges of terrorism
Buffalo Six
Living people
People from Lackawanna, New York
Lackawanna College alumni
Year of birth missing (living people)